Tarik Darreh (also Romanized as Tārīk Darreh) is a village in Deylaman Rural District, Deylaman District, Siahkal County, Gilan Province, Iran. At the 2006 census, its population was 54, in 18 families.

References 

Populated places in Siahkal County